The following is a list of notable report generator software. Reporting software is used to generate human-readable reports from various data sources.

Commercial software

 ActiveReports
 Actuate Corporation
 BOARD
 Business Objects
 Cognos BI
 Crystal Reports
 CyberQuery
 GoodData
 icCube
 I-net Crystal-Clear
 InetSoft
 Information Builders' FOCUS and WebFOCUS
 Jedox
 List & Label
 Logi Analytics
 m-Power
 MATLAB
 MicroStrategy
 Navicat
 OBIEE
 Oracle Discoverer
 Oracle Reports
 Hyperion
 Oracle XML Publisher
 Parasoft DTP
 PolyAnalyst
 Power BI
 Plotly
 Proclarity
 QlikView
 RapidMiner
 Roambi
 RW3 Technologies
 SiSense
 Splunk
 SQL Server Reporting Services
 Stimulsoft Reports
 Style Report
 Tableau
 Targit
 Telerik Reporting
  TIBCO
 Text Control
 Windward Reports
 XLCubed
 Zoomdata
 Zoho Analytics (as part of the Zoho Office Suite)

Free software

 BIRT Project
 D3.js
 JasperReports
 KNIME
 LibreOffice Base
 OpenOffice Base
 Pentaho

See also 
 Business intelligence software

References

Reporting software